Raising of the Cross (Dutch: Kruisoprichting) is a circa 1633-1645 painting by the Dutch Golden Age painter Rembrandt in the collection of the Museum Bredius. It was assumed to have been painted as a study for Rembrandt's larger painting of the same subject, as part of a series commissioned in 1633 by Frederick Henry, Prince of Orange. Having been rejected as autograph by the Rembrandt Research Project after Abraham Bredius's death, it was recently reattributed to the master by Jeroen Giltaij, though dendrochronology indicates the wood for the panel was not felled before 1642.

Catalogued as Rembrandt 
This painting was documented as a study by Hofstede de Groot in 1915, who wrote:

His entry was copied from Smith in 1836, who wrote:

Abraham Bredius bought the painting in 1921 as a genuine Rembrandt and included it in his 1935 catalog raisonné. Kurt Bauch expressed doubts about the work, and Horst Gerson called it a ‘crude imitation, vaguely based on Rembrandt’.

References

Paintings by Rembrandt
1640s paintings
Paintings in The Hague
Rembrandt